The new town of Lhatse or Lhatse Xian, also known as Quxar (Quxia, or Chusar, is a small town of a few thousand people in the Tibet Autonomous Region in the valley of the Yarlung Tsangpo River in Lhatse County,  southwest of Shigatse and just west of the mountain pass leading to it.

Region
At the western end of the town is another small monastery, Changmoche.

 east of Lhatse are the Xiqian Hot Springs, widely renowned for their healing properties.

Further east are the ruins of the Drampa Gyang Monastery, one of King Songtsän Gampo's main geomantic temples built in the 7th century. It was thought to pin down the troublesome left hip of the ogress whose body lay under all the high plateau with her heart located under the Jokhang in Lhasa. It once housed an image of Vairocana.

Near this spot in the 14th century the tertön or treasure finder, Sangpo Drakpa, discovered the popular Nyingma text by Padmasambhava called the Leu Dunma, which is a collection of prayers and devotions. This Jonang-school stupa was also called Tongdrol Chempo ('The Great Chorten that Gives Liberation by Setting Eyes upon It').

East of the ruins of the kumbum is the reconstructed Phuntsoling Monastery which was once attached to it. The main monastery and kumbum were restored and expanded by the renowned historian Taranatha (1575-1634) of the Jonang school. Under the 5th Dalai Lama (1617 – 1682), the Jonang school was suppressed and it was converted to the Gelug after Taranatha's death.

Further east is a little valley where there was previously a Nyingma gompa and hermitages, above which is the large cave of Gyang Lompo Lung which contains a shrine. The whole valley was, however, deserted in 1985.

Because the roads to Mount Everest and to Mount Kailash divide just west of Lhatse, the town is a common lunch stop for tour groups heading to those locations. Buddhist festivals are sometimes held at the monastery, drawing inhabitants from the surrounding region. There are several hotels and restaurants in the town.

Sister city 
In 2010, the French city of Salles-sur-Garonne became a sister city of town of Lhatse.

Notable citizens 

Born in Lhatse, Geshe Tenzin Sherab escaped over the Himalaya to exile in India where he obtained his Lharampa Geshe degree and after his "commitments were fulfilled at Sera Je, he arrived in Deer Park in early May 2013 before His Holiness’ visit. Geshe Tenzin Sherab-la serves as the current resident teacher..." at the Deer Park Buddhist Center in Oregon, Wisconsin.

Footnotes

References
 Dorje, Gyume. (1999). Footprint Tibet Handbook with Bhutan. Footprint Handbooks, Bath, England. .
 Dowman, Keith. 1988. The Power-Places of Central Tibet: The Pilgrim's Guide. Routledge & Kegan Paul. London.  (ppk).
 Mayhew and Kohn (2005). Tibet. Bradley Mayhew and Michael Kohn. 6th edition. Lonely Planet. 1st Edition 1986.

External links

Populated places in Shigatse
Township-level divisions of Tibet

zh:曲下镇